Straumsnes or Strømsnes is a village in Narvik Municipality in Nordland county, Norway.  The village is located along the Rombaken fjord between the town of Narvik and the village of Hergot.  The village has a train station on the Ofotbanen railway line, between Narvik Station and Rombak Station.  The village sits along the European route E06 highway, just southeast of the Rombak Bridge.

References

External links
List of stations on the Ofotbane (Jernbaneverket)

Narvik
Villages in Nordland
Populated places of Arctic Norway